Boston Latin School is a public exam school located in Boston, Massachusetts, that was founded in 1635. It is the first public school and the oldest existing school in the United States.

The school's first class included nine students; the school now has 2,400 pupils drawn from all parts of Boston. Its graduates have included four Harvard presidents, eight Massachusetts state governors, and five signers of the United States Declaration of Independence, as well as several preeminent architects, a leading art historian, a notable naturalist and the conductors of the New York Philharmonic and Boston Pops orchestras. There are also several notable non-graduate alumni, including Louis Farrakhan, a leader of the Nation of Islam. Boston Latin admitted only male students at its founding in 1635. The school's first female student was admitted in the nineteenth century. In 1972, Boston Latin admitted its first co-educational class.

Admission is determined by a combination of a student's score on the independent school Entrance Examination and recent grades, and is limited to residents of the city of Boston. Although Boston Latin runs from the 7th through the 12th grade, it admits students only into the 7th and 9th grades. In 2007, the school was named one of the top twenty high schools in the United States by U.S. News & World Report.

Alumni

Graduate alumni

 

 

 

 

 

}}

a  "—" indicates the year of graduation is unknown.

Non-graduate alumni

Abraham Captain Ratshesky ("Cap"). At age 14, he left Boston Latin School to work with his father. In 1895, he and his brother founded the U.S. Trust Company and was one of the founding members of Beth Israel Hospital. He donated a building in Boston to the American Red Cross, and was founder of the "Pennies Campaign" in 1925 where school children throughout the country raised money to restore the U.S.S. Constitution ("Old Ironsides"). In 1917, Ratshesky organized and financed relief efforts for the Halifax Explosion which killed over 2,000 Haligonians when an ammunition ship exploded in Halifax Harbour. The work of Ratshesky and his colleagues inspired the annual gift of the Christmas tree each year from Nova Scotia.

References

 
Boston-related lists
Lists of American people by school affiliation
Lists of grade school alumni in Massachusetts